Tom Lavin is a Chicago-born 1950 musician and record producer and founding member of the Juno Award winning (1981) Canadian group, Powder Blues. Leader, Tom Lavin has written many of the band’s best-known songs including ‘Doin’ It Right’ a SOCAN Classics Winner and ‘Boppin With the Blues’.
Tom Lavin has won BCMIA awards for ‘Guitarist, Singer, Songwriter and Producer of the Year’, a Juno award for ‘Best New Band’ and the American W.C. Handy Blues Music Award.

As a record producer, Lavin has over a dozen gold, and platinum records for Powder Blues, Prism, April Wine, Long John Baldry, Amos Garrett, and many others. Lavin played guitar on Prism's self-titled album, Prism (1977) on GRT Records, and guitar and drums on the Dale Jacobs and Cobra album for CBS Records (1977). As a composer, Lavin is credited with the soundtrack scores for Out of the Blue (1980), and Genie Award winning My American Cousin (1985).

Other CDs produced by Lavin include Juno Award nominated James Buddy Rogers 'My Guitar's My Only Friend' and 'Rollin' With the Blues Boss' by Kenny 'Blues Boss' Wayne Stony Plain Records. Lavin continues to record and perform as Tom Lavin & the Legendary Powder Blues Band and is also currently director of the Pacific Audio Visual Institute.

References

External links

Tom Lavin & the Legendary Powder Blues Band Official Website
Pacific Audio Visual Institute

Canadian blues guitarists
Canadian male guitarists
Blues rock musicians
Electric blues musicians
Chicago blues musicians
Living people
Guitarists from Illinois
Prism (band) members
Powder Blues Band members
Year of birth missing (living people)